Jessica Kingsley Publishers (JKP) is an independent, multinational publishing house headquartered in London, and founded in 1987 by Jessica Kingsley.

History 
Early on JKP published books pertaining to the social sciences and behavioural sciences, with special attention to art therapy and autism spectrum disorders, respectively. In 2022, the company is described as a "leading publisher in the field of manual therapies and movement".

In 2004, the company opened an American office in Philadelphia. In 2017, Hachette UK acquired JKP, and folded the company into John Murray Press. In 2022, JKP acquired the Scottish publishing company Handspring, known for educational and reference book press.

Awards 
In 2007, at the first year of the Independent Publishers Awards, JKP won the van Tulleken Publisher of the Year Award for "encapsulating the very best of independent publishing in the UK" and also the Taylor Wessing Academic & Professional Publisher of the Year award.

Selected notable authors
 Donna Williams (Nobody Nowhere, Somebody Somewhere, Like Colour to the Blind, Everyday Heaven)
 Gunilla Gerland (A Real Person: Life on the Outside)
 Jacqui Jackson (Multicoloured Mayhem, Damned Hard Day)
 Jennifer Cook O'Toole (Asperkids series, Sisterhood of the Spectrum)
 Jennifer Elder (Different Like Me, Autistic Planet)
 Paul Newham (Using Voice and.. in Therapy series, Therapeutic Voicework)
 Rudy Simone (Aspergirls)
 Simon Baron-Cohen (An Exact Mind)
 Tony Attwood (The Complete Guide to Asperger Syndrome)

References

External links 
 

Book publishing companies based in London
Book publishing companies based in Pennsylvania